Savareh may refer to:
 Savareh, Ardabil
 Savareh, East Azerbaijan
 Savareh, Khuzestan
 Savareh, Kohgiluyeh and Boyer-Ahmad